Nagovitsyn is a Russian masculine surname, its feminine counterpart is Nagovitsyna. It may refer to
Vyacheslav Nagovitsin, Russian composer
Yelena Nagovitsyna (born 1982), Russian long-distance runner

See also
Nogovitsin

Russian-language surnames